Katherine Elizabeth Fleming is President and CEO of the J. Paul Getty Trust and the Alexander S. Onassis Professor of Hellenic Culture and Civilization in the Department of History at New York University (NYU) as well as Provost Emerita of the university. She was Provost of NYU from 2016 to 2022. In April 2022, she was named President and CEO of the J. Paul Getty Trust and assumed the position on August 1, 2022.

Career 
Fleming holds a certificate in Theology from King's College London (1985). She earned a BA in religion from Barnard College (1988), an MA in religion from the Divinity School at the University of Chicago (1989), and a PhD in history (1995) from the University of California, Berkeley

She specializes in the modern history of Greece and the broader Mediterranean, with a particular focus on religious minorities.

Fleming was the second director (after Tony R. Judt) of the Remarque Institute. Fleming was associate director of the institute from 2002 until Judt's death in 2010.

Fleming is also a permanent associate member of the faculty of the department of history of the École Normale Supérieure in Paris, where she ran a longstanding workshop on the history of the Mediterranean with the French historian of Italy, Gilles Pécout.  Fleming was in residence at the École Normale from 2007 to 2011, although she retained her positions at NYU.

Fleming is the co-founder and co-director (with Sofia Papaioannou) of "Istorima," a large-scale oral history/public humanities project funded by the Stavros Niarchos Foundation.

Fleming has sat on the boards of numerous journals, among them the American Historical Review. Fleming was President of the board of the University of Piraeus in Piraeus, Greece from 2012 to 2016.  She is an appointee to the Administrative Board of the Chancellerie des Universites de Paris, and sits on the Executive Board of the John S. Latsis Public Benefit Foundation in Greece and on the Board of Directors of Time Partners, an independent private markets advisory firm based in London.

Honors 
In 2016, the government of Greece recognized her contributions to Greek culture by granting her honorary Greek citizenship.

In 2017, the University of Macedonia (Thessaloniki) awarded her an honorary doctorate in recognition of outstanding scholarship and contributions to the study of Greek history.

In 2018, Ionian University (Corfu) awarded her an honorary doctorate in recognition of outstanding contributions to Greece and the study of Greece.

In 2019, Fleming was named to the French Légion d'Honneur.

In 2021, Fleming was elected Fellow of the American Academy of Arts and Sciences.

In 2022, the government of Greece decorated her as a Commander in the Order of Beneficence, in recognition of her contributions to Greek culture and her contributions to Arts & Letters.

Published works

Books 
Fleming's first book, The Muslim Bonaparte: Diplomacy & Orientalism in Ali Pasha's Greece (Princeton, 1999), was not widely reviewed in the US at the time of its publication, but has gone on to be a standard of doctoral reading lists in cultural history and in the history of southeastern Europe, and has been translated into Albanian, Greek, Italian, and Turkish. In Greece, the Greek edition was widely reviewed and received coverage in the popular press.

Fleming's second book, Greece: A Jewish History (Princeton, 2008), has received numerous awards: a National Jewish Book Award; the Runciman Award; the Prix Alberto Benveniste; and an honorable mention, Keeley Book Prize of the Modern Greek Studies Association
and received considerable popular press in Greece.  It has been translated into Greek and French. In the English-speaking academy the book has been widely and largely positively reviewed, though some reviewers have objected to its "anti-Zionist" and "diasporist" approach, which minimizes and to an extent rejects the centrality of Israel and of Zionism.

The book has appeared in both Greek and French editions.

Fleming is co-editor, with Adnan Husain, of A Faithful Sea: The Religious Cultures of the Mediterranean 1200–1700 (Oxford OneWorld, 2007).

Other publications 
Fleming has also authored numerous articles, book chapters, and encyclopedia entries, of which the most cited is "Orientalism, the Balkans, and Balkan Historiography",  published in the American Historical Review in 2000.
  
In 2009, the journal Nationalities Papers printed an apology and retraction after it published an article that made extensive use of Fleming's work without citation or reference (Alice Curticapean, "Are you Hungarian or Romanian?" in Nationalities Papers, Volume 35, No. 3, pp. 411–427; retraction printed Volume 37, No. 4).

Fleming is a prolific book reviewer, and has published close to one hundred reviews in both academic and popular publications.

Family
Fleming is the daughter of the American literary critic John V. Fleming and of the British-born Joan E. Fleming, a prominent priest in the Episcopal diocese of New Jersey and Rector Emerita of Christ Church parish, New Brunswick.

She has two brothers, Richard Arthur Fleming, a travel writer; and Luke Owles Fleming, a linguistic anthropologist.

She is the mother of three daughters.

References

1965 births
Living people
Alumni of King's College London
Barnard College alumni
University of Chicago alumni
University of California, Berkeley alumni
New York University faculty
21st-century American historians
People from New Jersey
American women historians
Historians of modern Greece
21st-century American women writers